The Kerala Students Union (abbreviated KSU) is a students organization in Kerala, India. It functions as the student wing of the Indian National Congress in the state.

KSU was founded in 1957 at Alappuzha, with M. A. John  as its main organiser and Vayalar Ravi  founding general secretary. The original group consisted of M. A. John, Vayalar Ravi, George Tharakan and A.A. Samad. It functioned as the student wing of the Pradesh Congress Committee. While  Ravi was the President, KSU took a leading role in the opposition campaign against the communist state government. KSU sought to challenge the near-monopoly of the communist-led All India Students Federation over campus politics at the time. KSU played a key role in the movement that toppled the communist state government.

NSUI 
KSU emerged as the largest political force at high schools and colleges in the state by the early 1960s. KSU became the main force in establishing the National Students Union of India, the new students wing of the Indian National Congress.

National Students Union of India (NSUI), the student wing of the Indian National Congress (INC or Congress), was established on 9 April 1971. The organisation was founded by Indira Gandhi after merging the Kerala Students Union and the West Bengal State Chhatra Parishad to form a national students' organisation

References

National Students' Union of India
Indian National Congress of Kerala
1957 establishments in Kerala